Wojciech Wilk (born 12 August 1972 in Kraśnik) is a Polish politician. He was elected to the Sejm on 25 September 2005, getting 5,501 votes in 6 Lublin district as a candidate from the Civic Platform list.

See also
Members of Polish Sejm 2005-2007
 Wilk – people with the surname Wilk

External links
Wojciech Wilk - parliamentary page - includes declarations of interest, voting record, and transcripts of speeches.

1972 births
Living people
People from Kraśnik
Civic Platform politicians
Members of the Polish Sejm 2005–2007
Members of the Polish Sejm 2007–2011
Mayors of places in Poland